The Sound Of Your Heart is a South Korean television series starring Lee Kwang-soo and Jung So-min. The sitcom is based on the webtoon of the same name. The first 10 episodes were aired as a web series  on November 7, 2016 through Naver TV Cast on Mondays at 6:00 (KST), and the remaining 10 episodes aired from December 2016. The web series hit 100 million views on Sohu TV and ranked No. 1 among Korean dramas on the site. On Naver TV Cast, the web series has more than 40 million views in South Korea as of February 2017. It is also now airing on Netflix.

Plot 
Stories about Cho Seok's (Lee Kwang-soo) adventures with his family and his girlfriend Aebong (Jung So-min).

Cast

Main cast 
 Lee Kwang-soo as Jo Seok, a webtoon artist who lives with his parents
 Kim Dae-myung as Jo Joon, Jo Seok's older brother, who works at an entertainment company
 Jung So-min as Choi Ae-bong, Jo Seok's new girlfriend, whom she knew since high school
 Kim Byeong-ok as Jo Chul-wang, Jo Seok's father, who works a chicken shop that barely gets customers (due in part to closing early half the time)
 Kim Mi-kyung as Kwon Jung-kwon, Jo Seok's mother. who has grown fed up with her life.

Others 

 Kim Kang-hyun as manager
 Yoo Hyun-jung as Jo Seok's friend
 Yein as female student
 Lee Jae-uk as teacher / resident 1
 Moon Ji-yoon as Jo-suk's colleague	
 Choi Dae-sung as taxi driver
 Jung Ji-won as news announcer
 In Sung-ho as association staff
 Keum Kwang-san as Chul-wang's challenger
 Lee Jin-mok as Chul-wang's friend 1
 Lee Kwan-yeong as Chul-wang's friend 2
 Lim Jae-joon as Kim Suk's boyfriend
 Oh Min-suk
 So Yi-hyun

Special appearances 

 Jo Seok as author Jo
 Song Joong-ki as friend
 Yeom Dong-heon as Manager Lee
 Seo Hyun-chul as Vice Head of a Division Oh
 Choi Yang-rak as photographer
 Moon Kyung-ja as Green Juice woman
 Kim Sook as Kim Sook
 Kang Kyun-sung as Kang Kyun-sung
 Jung I-rang as young woman
 Park Na-rae as Park Na-rae
 Yoon Jin-yi as Fake Ae-bong
 Kim Roi-ha as Mac president 
 Lee Soo-ji as Voice phishing
 Kim Min-kyung as hunting woman
 Woo Hyun as Choi Ae-bong's father (Ep. 13).
 Cao Lu as woman in hotel room
 Tae Won-seok as naked man in China hotel room
 Jung Joon-young as neighbor in Apt. 205
 Kim Se-jeong as neighbor in Apt. 205
 Kim Tae-Won as himself
 Shin Dong-yup as himself
 Jun Hyun-moo as himself
 Lena Park as herself
 Park Seul-Ki as herself
 Laboum as themselves
 Ahn Sol-bin as herself
 Kim Jong-kook as Jo Seok's twin cousins Jo Jong-kook and Jo Jong-wook
 Gong Seung-yeon as Yerim

Production 
First script reading took place March 24, 2016 at KBS Annex Broadcasting Station in Yeouido, South Korea. The filming took 52 days, it began in March and ended in May.

Ratings

Awards and nominations

References

External links
  

Korean Broadcasting System television dramas
2016 South Korean television series debuts
South Korean web series
2016 web series debuts
Naver TV original programming
Television shows based on South Korean webtoons
The Sound of Heart
Korean-language Netflix exclusive international distribution programming